Fallen is a 2006 ABC Family miniseries based on The Fallen series of novels by Thomas Sniegoski, and broken into three parts. The first part was originally advertised as an "ABC Family Original Movie", but nearly a year later, it was followed up with two other parts of equal length over the course of a weekend. Fallen stars Paul Wesley as Aaron Corbett, a good-natured high school student who discovers he is a Nephilim, human-angel hybrid. An alternate reality game advertising the series won a Primetime Emmy Award for Outstanding Interactive Program.

Summary

On Aaron Corbett's 18th birthday, he begins exhibiting strange abilities, such as the ability to talk to animals. It is revealed that Aaron is the Redeemer of prophecy, a Nephil with the ability to redeem the fallen angels and return them to Heaven. Aaron leaves his adopted family and spends the next year traveling the world with the angel Camael in order to fulfill his destiny.

A fallen angel known as Azazel is released from his prison by a shadowy figure, who enlists his help in "aiding the Redeemer in fulfilling his destiny." Camael, having been wounded in a battle with the Powers, is put into a trance in order for him to heal, giving Aaron the freedom to do what he wishes. Aaron visits a nearby college, where he discovers an obsessive professor who has captured a Nephil, who turns out to be Aaron's old high school crush Vilma Rodriguez. Aaron rescues Vilma, but inadvertently alerts the Powers to his whereabouts. Camael arrives to defend Aaron and Vilma from Mazarin, the leader of the Powers, and his forces, but is captured. Aaron and Vilma are saved by Azazel. Azazel leads them underground and falsely tells them that Camael is dead.

Camael tries desperately to reveal the truth that Aaron is a part of the Creator's divine plan, but Mazarin refuses to listen and cuts Camael's wings off as punishment. Aaron begins doubting himself, and Azazel tells him of a man known as "the Light Bringer", who made the initial prophecy of the Redeemer and who could help quell his suspicions that his abilities are somehow wrong. When Aaron discovers the fallen doesn't have long to live, he gives in and redeems Anane, once again alerting the Powers. Refusing to run, Aaron decides to face them, even if it means his death.

Aaron and Azazel defeat the Powers, and force Mazarin and his second-in-command to leave. Camael returns to Ariel for help. Aaron, Vilma, Gabriel, and Azazel travel up a mountain where the Light Bringer's temple is. Aaron alone ventures inside and it is revealed that the Light Bringer is not only Aaron's true father but Lucifer, the first fallen and leader of the Great Rebellion against God in Heaven. Vilma enters the temple to save Aaron, only to be taken to Hell.

Lucifer tells Aaron that if he redeems him, allowing him to return to Heaven to conquer the Creator, he will release Vilma. Vilma, however, escapes on her own, leading Aaron to the conclusion the only one trapped in Hell is Lucifer. Aaron defeats Lucifer, then escapes in time to redeem Camael. Mazarin finally accepts Aaron as a part of God's plan and refuses to hunt the Nephilim or the Fallen anymore. Mazarin returns Azazel to his prison, while Aaron, Vilma, and Gabriel decide to return home.

Cast

 Paul Wesley as Aaron Corbett
 Chelah Horsdal as Lori Corbett
 Ivana Miličević as Ariel
 Kwesi Ameyaw as Policeman
 Fernanda Andrade as Vilma Rodriguez
 Sharon Canovas as Vilma's cousin
 Stuart Cowan as David Brady
 Doolittle as Gabriel the Talking Dog
 Alex Ferris as Stevie
 Bryan Cranston as Lightbringer / Lucifer Morningstar
 Jesse Hutch as Peter Lockhart
 Jennifer Kitchen as Driver
 Diego Klattenhoff as Nathaniel
 Elizabeth Lackey as Verchiel
 Carmen Lavigne as Zeke's Daughter
 Byron Lawson as Kushiel
 Tom Skerritt as Zeke
 Malcolm Stewart as Dr. Michael Jonas
 Peter Williams as Kolazonta
 Rick Worthy as Camael
 Will Yun Lee as Mazarin
 Hal Ozsan as Azazel
 Ty Olsson as Hawkins
 Christian Vincent as Michael the Archangel
 Natassia Malthe as Gadreel
 Rade Šerbedžija as Prof. Lukas Grasic

Reception
Common Sense Media rated the miniseries 4 out of 5 stars.

It has also been reviewed in Variety, The Orange Country Register, and Deseret News.

References

External links
 

ABC Family original films
American television miniseries
Films about angels
2006 television films
2006 films
2007 television films
2007 films
Angels in television
The Devil in film
Films directed by Mikael Salomon